The Mace-Trefethen Seamaster is an American single seat seaplane racer.

Design and development
The Seamaster was developed by Parks College Alumni as the Parks Alumni Racer. It is a single place, mid-wing seaplane with a Y tail layout and a single  fuselage-mounted float. The pusher propeller configuration was modified to a conventional tractor layout.

Specifications (Seamaster)

References

Racing aircraft
Mid-wing aircraft
Aircraft first flown in 1950